Our Lady of the Southern Cross College is a  systemic Roman Catholic co-educational secondary day school located in the town of Dalby, approximately  northwest of Brisbane, Queensland, Australia.

Overview
Established in 2008, the college caters for students from preparatory to Year 12. It is the only Catholic school in Dalby and it also serves a large rural area and a number of small towns. Prior to 2008, St Columba's school, established by the Sisters of Mercy in 1877, was the Catholic primary school for Dalby and St Mary's Catholic College, established by the Christian Brothers in 1962, was the Catholic secondary college for Dalby. In 2012 the enrolment was 770 students including 455 students in the Primary section of the college.

See also

Catholic education in Australia
List of schools in Queensland

References

External links 
Our Lady of the Southern Cross College website  
Catholic Education Office: Diocese of Toowoomba
Queensland Catholic Education Commission

Catholic secondary schools in Queensland
Educational institutions established in 2008
Roman Catholic Diocese of Toowoomba
2008 establishments in Australia
Catholic primary schools in Queensland
Dalby, Queensland
Former Congregation of Christian Brothers schools in Australia